The Sensible Marijuana Policy Initiative, also known as Massachusetts Ballot Question 2, was an initiated state statute that replaced prior criminal penalties with new civil penalties on adults possessing an ounce or less of marijuana.  The initiative appeared on the November 4, 2008, ballot in Massachusetts.

The measure was passed on Nov 4. and became public law on January 2, 2009

Question 2:

Replaced criminal penalties with a US$100 fine of which the proceeds go to the city where the offense takes place.
Eliminated the collection of Criminal Offender Record Information (CORI) reports for minor marijuana related infractions.
Maintained then-current penalties for selling, growing, and trafficking marijuana, as well as the prohibition against driving under the influence of marijuana.
The law requires additional penalties for minors such as Parental notification, compulsory drug awareness program, and 10 hours community service that was not required under prior law. It also requires a larger US$1,000 fine and possible delinquency proceedings for those under 17 if they do not complete the requirements of the law.

The law represents a break with prior law in Massachusetts, where people charged with marijuana possession faced criminal penalties of up to six months in jail and a US$500 fine, as well as a CORI report being filed.

On Tuesday, September 10, 2008, a city councillor in Worcester called for a vote on a measure to express the opposition by the city of Worcester to the
initiative.  The city council rejected and voted down the measure by a 10-1 vote, with the only vote for the measure coming from the councillor that requested the vote.

Supporters
The Committee for Sensible Marijuana Policy is the leading proponent of the initiative.

Organizations
 National Association of Social Workers—Massachusetts Chapter
 Greater Boston Civil Rights Coalition
 Criminal Justice Policy Coalition
 American Civil Liberties Union — National
 Law Enforcement Against Prohibition
 American Civil Liberties Union — Massachusetts chapter
 National Organization for the Reform of Marijuana Laws
 Massachusetts Cannabis Reform Coalition, Inc. (aka "MassCann")
 Univ. of Massachusetts, Amherst Cannabis Reform Coalition (not part of prev. listed group, "MassCann")
 Union of Minority Neighborhoods
 The Boston Worker's Alliance
 Marijuana Policy Project
 Brookline Police Department

Individuals
 Paul T. Breeden - President/CEO Boston Live Magazine/Boston Live Charity Fund Inc.
 Ronald Ansin, ACLU, philanthropist
 Charles H. Baron, Esq., Boston College School of Law
 Jack Cole, Law Enforcement Against Prohibition
 Michael D. Cutler, Esq.
 Richard Elliott Doblin, PhD, MAPS
 Sergeant Howard Donohue, a 33-year veteran of the Boston Police Department
 Lester Grinspoon, M.D., associate professor emeritus of psychiatry at Harvard Medical School
 John H. Halpern, M.D., assistant professor of psychiatry at Harvard Medical School
 Massachusetts state Sen. Patricia Jehlen (D-Second Middlesex), chair of the Joint Committee on Elder Affairs and Vice-Chair of the Joint Committee on State Administration and Regulatory Oversight
 Wendy Kaminer, Esq., ACLU, author, journalist
 Woody Kaplan, ACLU, philanthropist
 Thomas R. Kiley, Esq., Cosgrove, Eisenberg & Kiley
 Karen Klein, Brandeis University, Unitarian Universalists for Drug Policy Reform
 Lanny Kutakoff, Partakers, Inc.
 Dr. Robert Meenan, dean of the Boston University School of Public Health
 Lieutenant Thomas Nolan, a 30-year veteran of the Boston Police Department who now teaches criminology at Boston University
 Massachusetts state Rep. Frank Smizik (D-Fifteenth Norfolk), chair of the Joint Committee on Environment, Natural Resources and Agriculture
 Carl Valvo, Esq., Cosgrove, Eisenberg & Kiley
 Ernest "Tony" Windsor, Esq., Massachusetts Law Reform Institute
 George Soros - Hedge Fund Manager
 Massachusetts State Rep. Jim O'Day (D-fourteenth Worcester)

Religious Leaders
 Rev. Jean Alexander, Auburndale
 Rabbi Alan Alpert, Leominster
 Rev. Molly Baskette, Somerville
 Father Richard Beaulieu, Winchester
 Rev. Jim Bronwell, Barre
 Rev. Suzanne Brunnquell, Pittsfield
 Rev. Sarah Buteux, Amherst
 Rev. Dr. Jan Carlsson-Bull, Cohasset
 Rev. Thomas Carlton, Ludlow
 Rev. Stephen Cook
 Father Richard Crowley, Middleboro
 Rev. C. Edward Deyton, Andover
 Father Thomas Dilorenzo, Winthrop
 Rev. Jonathan Drury, Andover
 Rev. Leigh Dry, Hopkinton
 Rev. Kathrene Duhon, Great Barrington
 Rev. Lisa Durkee Abbott, West Brookfield
 Rev. Dr. Dorothy May Emerson, Billerica
 Rev. Marc Fredette, Waltham
 Rev. Tamarack Garlow, Ashley Falls
 Rev. John Gibbons, Bedford
 Rev. Jamie Green, West Groton
 Rev. Edward Hardy, Abington
 Rev. William Hobbs, Athol
 Rev. Dr. Anne Ierardi, Yarmouthport
 Ms. Marion Jansen, Great Barrington
 Rev. David Johnson, Plymouth
 Rev. Bill Leggett, Milford
 Father John Lis, Williamsburg
 Rev. Jeffrey Long-Middleton, Acton
 Rev. Ian Lynch, Brimfield
 Rev. Art McDonald, Essex
 Rabbi Richard Messing, North Easton
 Rev. Stephen Philbrick, Cummington
 Rev. Susie Phoenix, Lee
 Rev. Katherine Reis, Rockport
 Rev. Edmund Robinson, Chatham
 Rev. Ken Sawyer, Wayland
 Rev. Dr. Victor Scalise, Somerville
 Rev. Warren Scamman, Windsor
 Rev. Richard Schlak, Foxboro
 Rev. Stephen Shick, Hudson
 Rev. Judith Smith-Valley, Brewster
 Rev. Paul Sprecher, Hingham
 Rev. C. William Steelman, Nantucket
 Rev. Rachel Tedesco, Taunton
 Rev. Jonathan Tetherly, Chicopee
 Rev. Patricia Tummino, Middleboro
 Rabbi Andrew Vogel, Brookline
 Rev. Vicki Woods, Worcester
 Rev. Dr. Judith Wright, Boylston

Newspaper Editorial endorsements
 The Daily Free Press
 The Bay state Banner
 The Harvard Crimson
 The Newton TAB
 The Milford Daily News
 The Springfield Republican
 The Metrowest Daily News
 The Daily News Tribune
 The Brookline TAB
 The Fall River Herald News
 The Danvers Herald
 MIT Tech

Polls
A Suffolk University / WHDH Channel 7 poll has shown that 72 percent of Greater Boston residents are in favor of replacing criminal penalties with civil fines for carrying an ounce or less of marijuana.  "The public may be signaling that pursuing small-time marijuana users is a waste of taxpayer resources," said David Paleologos, director of the Political Research Bureau at Suffolk University. "This issue suggests there is a libertarian streak in the thinking of the Massachusetts voter."  The poll was conducted with 400 residents between July 31 and August 3, 2008.

A FastTrack poll by WBZ TV /Survey USA on September 17 showed that 69% of all Massachusetts voters would favor either decriminalization or legalization.  It was broken down to 30% want it remain a crime, 31% want it changed to a civil fine and 38% would like it to be legalized completely. The poll had a margin of error of 4.5%.

Arguments in favor
Supporting arguments advanced by the proponents include:

It would save Massachusetts US$130 million per year, according to a 2002 report by Harvard economist Jeffrey Miron.
Instances of minor marijuana possession would no longer affect if people can obtain jobs, housing, and student loans.
Currently there are about 2.8 million CORI records on file for a population of 6 million.
Small convictions have been shown to have little or no impact on drug use.

History
The National Commission on Marijuana and Drug Abuse (also known as the Shafer Commission) was created by Public Law 91-513 in 1972 to study marijuana abuse in the United States.  It published its findings in a report called Marihuana: A Signal of Misunderstanding and recommended that the president should decriminalize possession of marijuana in amounts that constituted "simple possession".

So far 30 non-binding public policy questions calling for civil fines for possession of marijuana rather than criminal penalties have passed in legislative districts throughout Massachusetts since 2000.  These questions were passed with an average of 62% of the vote in favor. No Public policy question related to replacing criminal penalties with civil fines has ever failed in the state of Massachusetts.

The Joint Mental Health and Substance Abuse Committee of the Massachusetts General Court voted 6-1 in favor of a bill that would have made possession of less than an ounce of marijuana punishable by a civil fine.

Funding
Billionaire George Soros made an initial contribution of $400,000.  The committee has also received $750,000 cash as well as about $320,000 in donated time and services from the Marijuana Policy Project, an organization created to reform marijuana laws in the United States. According to campaign finance reports, as of November 1, 2008, the committee has raised approximately $1,250,000 to help pass the measure with $40,060.90 remaining.

OppositionThe Coalition for Safe Streets, a committee organized to oppose Question 2, launched a statewide campaign Sept. 5 to defeat the measure. Jonathan W. Blodgett, the Essex County District Attorney serves as the Coalition's treasurer and chairman.

Michael O'Keefe, the president of the Massachusetts District Attorneys Association, is opposed to the initiative.  He believes that the measure will lead to an increase in minors using the drug by sending the wrong message to them.

The O'Keefe Committee is one of ten committees representing district attorneys in Massachusetts that have contributed to the Coalition.

William Breault, chairman of the Main South Alliance for Public Safety in Worcester, also plans to oppose this initiative.

Funding
According to Campaign Finance reports, as of November 1, 2008, the ten committees representing district attorneys in Massachusetts have contributed approximately $2,275 each to the Coalition along with a donation of $2,500 from the Worcester County Deputy Sheriffs Association as well as a few other donors for a total of approx $60,000, after expenditures they have $0 to fight the initiative and $2,601.92 in outstanding liabilities.

Controversies
On September 17, 2008, the Committee for Sensible Marijuana Policy filed complaints with the Office of Campaign and Political Finance and the Attorney General's office against the Massachusetts District Attorney Association, the 11 state district attorneys and O'Neill and Associates''', a Boston public relations firm. Violations of the campaign finance law could result in up to 1 year in jail and a $1,000 fine.

Also, Middlesex District Attorney Gerry Leone has stated that in the event the majority of voters in the State of Massachusetts were to pass the initiative,  he will attempt to override the vote and defeat it in an appellate process.

Alleged Complaints
 Under Massachusetts law, it is illegal to solicit, receive, or spend funds to support or oppose a ballot initiative without first forming a political committee. CSMP alleges that the district attorneys solicited, received, and spent donations before they were legally allowed to, attempting to conceal their campaign activity for as long as they could.
 CSMP further alleges that the district attorneys used public funds to post and house a statement urging voters to reject the decriminalization initiative on its Web site, a violation of Massachusetts election law, which prohibits public officials from using public resources to advocate for or against a ballot initiative.  The statement on the state run Massachusetts District Attorneys Association website says that if the question is approved, "any person may carry and use marijuana at any time," which is untrue.

Petition drive to qualify
The support group collected over 105,000 signatures, far exceeding the requirement of 66,593 valid signatures.  Since Massachusetts is an indirect initiative state, this meant that the Massachusetts State Legislature had to take up the proposed measure.  Since the legislature declined to act on it by early May, the supporters then had until June 18, 2008, to collect another 11,099 signatures to ensure that the initiative is placed on the November 2008 statewide ballot, a goal at which they succeeded.

Results

Enactment
As per Massachusetts law, the initiative became public law on January 2, 2009, 30 days from the date it was presented to the Governor's Council and certified.

See also
 Massachusetts 2008 ballot measures
 Personal Use of Marijuana by Responsible Adults Act of 2008

References

External links
Committee for Sensible Marijuana Policy
Sensible Marijuana Policy Ballot Language
Attorney General's Opinion 07-09
Campaign finance registration statement of support committee
Committee for Sensible Marijuana Policy Radio spot
Committee for Sensible Marijuana Policy Television spots

2008 Massachusetts ballot measures
Sensible Marijuana Policy Initiative
Cannabis law reform in the United States
Drug control law in the United States
Initiatives in the United States
2008 cannabis law reform